Greg or Gregory Scott may refer to:

 Gregory Scott (1879–?), British film actor
 Gregory K. Scott (c. 1949–2021), Colorado Supreme Court justice
 Greg Scott (American football) (born 1979), former American football defensive end
 Greg Scott (ice hockey) (born 1988), Canadian ice hockey right winger
 Greg Scott (politician), member of the Pennsylvania House of Representatives (2023present)
 Greg Scott (rugby league) (born 1991), rugby league player
 Greg Scott (violinist), English violinist
 Malcom Gregory Scott, (born 1962) American writer, activist, and AIDS survivor

See also